Dorival das Neves Ferraz Júnior, known as Doriva (born 13 April 1987), is a Brazilian professional footballer who plays as a defensive midfielder for Greek Super League 2 club Kifisia.

References

External links
http://200.159.15.35/registro/registro.aspx?s=177911

1987 births
Living people
Brazilian footballers
Brazilian expatriate footballers
Expatriate footballers in Greece
Expatriate footballers in Japan
Criciúma Esporte Clube players
Tombense Futebol Clube players
Bangu Atlético Clube players
Madureira Esporte Clube players
Figueirense FC players
América Futebol Clube (MG) players
Xanthi F.C. players
Thrasyvoulos F.C. players
Anagennisi Karditsa F.C. players
Matsumoto Yamaga FC players
Grêmio Novorizontino players
A.E. Kifisia F.C. players
Super League Greece players
J1 League players
Association football defenders
Footballers from São Paulo (state)